Alvah T. Meyer (July 18, 1888 – December 19, 1939) was an American sprint runner. He was a Jewish member of the Irish American Athletic Club, which  also included Abel Kiviat and Myer Prinstein.

Meyer underperformed at the 1912 Olympic Trials and was only included to the US Olympic team on the condition that he pays his travel, which was eventually covered by his parents. He won the silver medal in the 100 meters, but was eliminated in the semi-finals of the 200 m event.

In 1914 he set a world indoor record at 60 yards, and in 1915 he set a world record at 330 yards.

See also
List of select Jewish track and field athletes

References

External links

 
 

1888 births
1939 deaths
American male sprinters
Jewish American sportspeople
Olympic silver medalists for the United States in track and field
Athletes (track and field) at the 1912 Summer Olympics
Medalists at the 1912 Summer Olympics